Astin Dar-e Olya (also Romanized as Āstīn Dar-e ‘Olyā; also known as Āstīn Dar-e Bālā) is a village in Ilat-e Qaqazan-e Gharbi Rural District, Kuhin District, Qazvin County, Qazvin Province, Iran. At the 2006 census, its population was 23, in 8 families.

References 

Populated places in Qazvin County